The discography of Karol Mikloš, a Slovak singer-songwriter, consists of four studio albums, two EPs, twelve singles, three music videos and nineteen additional appearances.

Albums

Studio albums

EPs

Singles

Other appearances

Videos

Music videos

References
 General
 
 Specific

External links
 Karol Mikloš discography (Official website)
 Karol Mikloš discography > Releases on Discogs
 Karol Mikloš discography > Releases at Deadred Records 
 Karol Mikloš discography > Releases at Starcastic Records 

Discography
Discographies of Slovak artists
Pop music discographies
Rock music discographies
Electronic music discographies